The Gengea is a right tributary of the river Bârlui in Romania. It flows into the Bârlui near Olari.

References

Rivers of Romania
Rivers of Olt County